= The Shepherd Girl =

1953 film

- Directed by: Moezzodivan Fekri
- Written by: Moezzodivan Fekri
- Cinematography: Nuri Habib
- Production company: Asre Talaie
- Release date: 29 December 1953
- Running time: 100 minutes
- Country: Iran
- Language: Persian

The Shepherd Girl (Persian: Dokhtare choopan) is a 1953 Iranian drama film directed by Moezzodivan Fekri. It follows the relationship of Ziba and Ahmed. Ahmed's family try to separate him from Ziba in the hopes that he will marry a wealthy girl.

== Partial cast ==
- Moezzodivan Fekri
- Majid Mohseni
- Taghi Zohuri

== Bibliography ==
- Mohammad Ali Issari. Cinema in Iran, 1900-1979. Scarecrow Press, 1989.
